The 2022 Baltic Cup was the 29th Baltic Cup, an international football tournament contested by the Baltic states. Iceland won their first ever title and was the first guest team in the tournament to ever win it.

Format
This year Iceland joined Estonia, Latvia and Lithuania, thus the knock-out tournament format first tried at 2012 Baltic Cup was used. Penalty shoot-outs were used to decide the winner if a match was drawn after 90 minutes.

Results

Matches

Latvia vs. Estonia

Lithuania vs. Iceland

3rd Place

Final

References

External links
2022 Baltic Cup Estonian Football Association

2020
2022 in Estonian football
2022 in Latvian football
2022 in Lithuanian football
November 2022 sports events in Europe